Reliable Pictures was an American film production and distribution company which operated from 1933 until 1937. Established by Harry S. Webb and Bernard B. Ray, it was a low-budget Poverty Row outfit that primarily specialized in Westerns. After its demise, the company's studios were taken over by Monogram Pictures.

Selected filmography

 The Mystic Hour (1933)
 Mystery Ranch (1934)
 The Cactus Kid (1934)
 Rawhide Mail (1934)
 Ridin' Thru (1934)
 Fighting Hero (1934)
 Terror of the Plains (1934)
 The Silver Bullet (1935)
 The Laramie Kid (1935)
 Midnight Phantom (1935)
 Unconquered Bandit (1935)
 North of Arizona (1935)
 Never Too Late (1935)
 Wolf Riders (1935)
 The Test (1935)
 The Live Wire (1935)
 Loser's End (1935)
 The Cactus Kid (1935)
 Rio Rattler (1935)
 Skull and Crown (1935)
 Born to Battle (1935)
 Coyote Trails (1935)
 Tracy Rides (1935)
 Texas Jack (1935)
 Trigger Tom (1935)
 The Fighting Pilot (1935)
 Silent Valley (1935)
 Pinto Rustlers (1936)
 The Speed Reporter (1936)
 Vengeance of Rannah (1936)
 Step on It (1936)
 Santa Fe Bound (1936)
 Fast Bullets (1936)
 The Millionaire Kid (1936)
 Caryl of the Mountains (1936)
 Ambush Valley (1936)
 Roamin' Wild (1936)
 Santa Fe Rides (1937)
 The Silver Trail (1937)

References

Bibliography
 Balio Tino. Grand Design: Hollywood as a Modern Business Entertprise 1930-1939. University of California Press, 1995.
 Pitts, Michael R. Poverty Row Studios, 1929–1940: An Illustrated History of 55 Independent Film Companies, with a Filmography for Each. McFarland & Company, 2005.

American film studios
Film production companies of the United States